KSNA (100.7 FM, "100.7 My FM") is a radio station broadcasting an Adult CHR format. Licensed to Idaho Falls, Idaho, United States, the station is currently owned by Sand Hill Media Corp and features programming from Jones Radio Networks.

History

The current KSNA license began as KGVM-FM 99.1 in 1966. KGVM-FM was owned by Golden Valley FM, Inc., until 1975, when the Federal Communications Commission approved after two years of delays a sale to Idaho Broadcasters, Inc. The call letters were changed to KUPI-FM, which would hold for most of the next 36 years, except for between 1979 and 1988, when the station was KQPI-FM instead.

In 2011, a large frequency shuffle involving dozens of stations swept the Mountain West. The 94.3 license was moved to 99.1 FM, and the existing 99.1 license was moved to 100.7. To keep the KUPI-FM country programming on 99.1, KSNA was relocated from one license at 94.3 to the other at 100.7, and the two stations also switched call signs; at the same time, KSNA shifted from CHR to adult CHR.

Previous logo on 94.3

References

External links

SNA
Adult top 40 radio stations in the United States